The folklore museum in Kastanofyto was set up in 1994 by the Kastanofyto Cultural Association in the building that used to house the primary school. The museum was established to preserve objects associated with the folk tradition so that generations to come will be able to learn about folk culture. All the exhibits come from the village itself.

Location
The museum is based in Kastanofyto - a small traditional mountain village approximately 30 km from Kastoria, Greece in the direction of Argos Orestiko.

Holdings
The first room has a display of photographs illustrating aspects of the villagers everyday life and such major social events as weddings, baptisms, national holidays, and school rallies. There are also quite a number of photographs of officers and soldiers of the Republican Army of Greece (DSE), because the village was the DSEs base in 1946–7.

The second room houses genuine traditional womens costumes of the late 19th century (everyday wear and bridal outfits), woven textiles, embroidery, a number of objects for everyday domestic use (cauldrons, baking trays, cooking-pots, and plates), agricultural implements (most notably a hand plough), millstones, a wooden barrel for collecting grain at the mill, and jars for the pickles and cereals that were stored in the cellars in winter.

The ground floor has been converted into a guest-house for visitors to the area.

Gallery

References

Folk museums in Western Macedonia